Howard Lawrence Hardy (born January 10, 1948, at Goose Creek, Texas) is an American former pitcher, coach and manager in professional baseball.

Hardy attended  Bellaire High School (Texas), and graduated from the University of Texas at Austin with a degree in business administration. Selected in the 23rd round of the  amateur draft by the San Diego Padres, he reached Major League Baseball with the 1974 Padres, appearing in 76 games as a rookie, all but one of them as a relief pitcher, winning nine games, saving two, and losing four. He would appear in only 18 more MLB games in 1975–1976, with the Padres and Houston Astros, and spend the rest of his playing career at the Triple-A level of minor league baseball. He had been traded along with Joe McIntosh from the Padres to the Astros for Doug Rader on December 11, 1975. In his MLB career, he posted a career earned run average of 5.29 in 94 games to accompany his 9–4 (.692) record.

 Hardy's coaching career began in 1978 as the pitching coach of the Charleston Charlies of the Triple-A International League, then Houston's top farm club. He switched to the Toronto Blue Jays' system in 1980 and served as a manager at the Double-A level as well as a minor league instructor. 

After coaching in the San Francisco Giants' organization, Hardy returned to Major League Baseball as a coach with the Texas Rangers where he was a member of manager Johnny Oates' coaching staff from  through .

References

External links

1948 births
Living people
Alexandria Aces players
Baseball players from Texas
Charleston Charlies players
Hawaii Islanders players
Houston Astros players
Lodi Padres players
Major League Baseball pitchers
Memphis Blues players
Sportspeople from Harris County, Texas
San Diego Padres players
Texas Longhorns baseball players
Texas Rangers coaches
Tri-City Padres players